The men's +80 kg competition at the 2016 Summer Olympics was held on 20 August, at the Carioca Arena 3.

The medals for the competition were presented by Nicole Hoevertsz, Aruba, IOC member and the gifts were presented by Dr. Choue Chungwon, President of the World Taekwondo Federation.

Competition format
The main bracket consisted of a single elimination tournament, culminating in the gold medal match. The top eight athletes in each event were seeded so as not to face each other in the preliminary round. The remainder of the qualified athletes were drawn randomly on 15 August 2016. Two bronze medals were awarded at the Taekwondo competitions.  A repechage was used to determine the bronze medal winners. Every competitor who lost to one of the two finalists competed in the repechage, another single-elimination competition. Each semifinal loser faced the last remaining repechage competitor from the opposite half of the bracket in a bronze medal match.

Schedule 
All times are in local time (UTC-3).

Seeds
Every practitioner was seeded at the event. Practitioners representing the hosting nation were seeded as no. 4 regardless of their current world ranking.

Results
Legend
DSQ – Disqualified
PTG – Won by points gap
SUD – Won by sudden death
SUP – Won by Superiority

Main bracket

1 Silla was ejected from the competition after he tested positive for melodonium prior to the Olympics.

Repechage

References

External links
Results

Taekwondo at the 2016 Summer Olympics
Men's events at the 2016 Summer Olympics